The Clerk of the House of Representatives of the Parliament of Australia is responsible for managing the Parliamentary Department of the House of Representatives. The Clerk is a non-elected administrative officer under the Parliamentary Service Act 1999. The term of the Clerk of the House of Representatives is now limited by law to 10 years. On 12 August 2019, Claressa Surtees became the first female Clerk of the House. 

The Department of the House of Representatives provides services to support the efficient conduct of the House of Representatives, its committees and certain joint committees as well as a range of services and facilities for House Members in the Australian Parliament House in Canberra, Australian Capital Territory. The Department also undertakes activities to promote the work of the House in the community and is responsible for the conduct of the Parliament's international and regional relations. The Clerk of the Australian House of Representatives conducts the election for Speaker.

The Department of the House of Representatives is not part of the Executive Government of Australia, being instead responsible to the Speaker of the Australian House of Representatives, who has accountability obligations for the department to the House of Representatives.

Since 1999, the terms of the Clerk of the House of Representatives and the Clerk of the Senate  have been limited to 10 years. The change did not apply to the incumbents.

Clerks of the House 
There have been 16 Clerks of the House. The longest-serving was Frank Green, who held the position for over 18 years. The shortest-serving was John McGregor, who held the position for 27 days. He collapsed while the House was speaking on a condolence motion for his predecessor Walter Gale, who had died in office a month earlier. McGregor was taken to Canberra Hospital where he died.

George Jenkins, the clerk of the Victorian Legislative Assembly, was seconded to the Federal Parliament for its first few months and acted as Clerk of the House during that time before the position was filled permanently.

See also 
 Clerk of the Australian Senate

References

External links
 Official website of Department of the House of Representatives
 Department of the House of Representatives, Annual Report 2013–14
 House of Representatives - Powers, practice and procedure

Clerk of the House of Representatives
Australian House of Representatives